Martin Heuberger (born 5 June 1964) is a German handball coach and a former player. Heuberger later coached the Germany men's national handball team.

Life 
Heuberger was born in Schutterwald and studied to become an administrator. Between 2014 and 2018 he worked in public administration in the district office in Offenburg

Career 
From 1994, he was player-coach ; in 1996 he was only coaching the TuS Schutterwald.

In 2004 he became assistant coach of the Germany men's national handball team under Heiner Brand. Between 2011 and 2014 he then served as head coach of the national team. Since 2018, he has been full time coach of the junior national team.

Success as player 
 Germany men's national handball team (1989-1991)
 1990 C World Championship: bronze medal

Success as coach 
 Germany men's national junior handball team (2002-2011)
 2004: European Junior Champion
 2006: European Junior Champion
 2009: Junior World Champion
 2011: Junior World Champion
 Germany men's national handball team (assistant 2004-2011)
 2006 European Championship: 5th place
 2007 World Championship : World Champion
 2008 European Championship: 4th place
 2008 Summer Olympics: 9th place
 2010 European Championship: 10th place
 2011 World Championship: 11th place
 Germany men's national handball team (main coach 2011-2014)
 2012 European Championship: 7th place
 2013 World Championship: 5th place

References

External links 
 Personal website (archived)
 Martin Heuberger at TuS Schutterwald

Living people
1964 births
German male handball players
People from Ortenaukreis
Sportspeople from Freiburg (region)